In mathematics, Cutler's bar notation is a notation system for large numbers, introduced by Mark Cutler in 2004.  The idea is based on iterated exponentiation in much the same way that exponentiation is iterated multiplication.

Introduction
A regular exponential can be expressed as such:

However, these expressions become arbitrarily large when dealing with systems such as Knuth's up-arrow notation.  Take the following:

Cutler's bar notation shifts these exponentials counterclockwise, forming .  A bar is placed above the variable to denote this change.  As such:

This system becomes effective with multiple exponents, when regular denotation becomes too cumbersome.

At any time, this can be further shortened by rotating the exponential counterclockwise once more.

The same pattern could be iterated a fourth time, becoming .  For this reason, it is sometimes referred to as Cutler's circular notation.

Advantages and drawbacks

The Cutler bar notation can be used to easily express other notation systems in exponent form.  It also allows for a flexible summarization of multiple copies of the same exponents, where any number of stacked exponents can be shifted counterclockwise and shortened to a single variable.  The bar notation also allows for fairly rapid composure of very large numbers.  For instance, the number  would contain more than a googolplex digits, while remaining fairly simple to write with and remember.

However, the system reaches a problem when dealing with different exponents in a single expression.  For instance, the expression  could not be summarized in bar notation.  Additionally, the exponent can only be shifted thrice before it returns to its original position, making a five degree shift indistinguishable from a one degree shift.  Some have suggested using a double and triple bar in subsequent rotations, though this presents problems when dealing with ten- and twenty-degree shifts.

Other equivalent notations for the same operations already exist without being limited to a fixed number of recursions, notably Knuth's up-arrow notation and hyperoperation notation.

See also
Mathematical notation

References

Mark Cutler, Physical Infinity, 2004
Daniel Geisler, tetration.org
R. Knobel. "Exponentials Reiterated." American Mathematical Monthly 88, (1981)

Mathematical notation
Large numbers